Royal Air Force Headcorn or more commonly known as RAF Headcorn is a former Royal Air Force Advanced Landing Ground located  northeast of Headcorn, Kent, England.

Opened in 1943, Headcorn was a prototype for the temporary Advanced Landing Ground airfields to be built in France after D-Day, when the need for advanced landing fields became urgent as the Allied forces moved east across France and Germany. It was used by the Royal Air Force and the United States Army Air Forces. It was closed in September 1944.

Units
Two Canadian squadrons, 403 Squadron RCAF and 421 Squadron RCAF, were based at Headcorn from August to November 1943 with Supermarine Spitfire IXB's.

The following units were also here at some point:
 No. 17 (Fighter) Wing RAF
 No. 127 Airfield
 362nd Fighter Group
 377th Fighter Squadron flying Republic P-47 Thunderbolts
 378th Fighter Squadron flying Republic P-47 Thunderbolts
 379th Fighter Squadron flying Republic P-47 Thunderbolts
 No. 405 Repair & Salvage Unit
 No. 2809 Squadron RAF Regiment
 No. 3207 Servicing Commando

See also
List of former Royal Air Force stations

References

Citations

Bibliography

Airfields of the IX Fighter Command in the United Kingdom
Royal Air Force stations of World War II in the United Kingdom
Royal Air Force stations in Kent